Matthew 15:28 is a verse in the fifteenth chapter of the Gospel of Matthew in the New Testament.

Content
In the original Greek according to Westcott-Hort for this verse is:
28:Τότε ἀποκριθεὶς ὁ Ἰησοῦς εἶπεν αὐτῇ, Ὦ γύναι, μεγάλη σου ἡ πίστις· γενηθήτω σοι ὡς θέλεις. Καὶ ἰάθη ἡ θυγάτηρ αὐτῆς ἀπὸ τῆς ὥρας ἐκείνης.  

In the King James Version of the Bible the text reads:
28:Then Jesus answered and said unto her, O woman, great is thy faith: be it unto thee even as thou wilt. And her daughter was made whole from that very hour.

The New International Version translates the passage as:
28:Then Jesus answered, "Woman, you have great faith! Your request is granted." And her daughter was healed from that very hour.

Analysis
Justus Knecht gives a moral lesson in prayer based on the woman writing:
Perseverance in Prayer. This woman did not give way to discouragement, although for a time Jesus would not hearken to her. His sole response to the intercession of His apostles was to say that He was sent only to the Israelites, and His reply to herself sounded very like an absolute refusal. This shows us that we ought never to weary of prayer, even though it seems as if God would not hearken to us.

Cornelius a Lapide writes, "Christ would not restrain any longer His admiration, but cried out as it were with wonder, O woman great is thy faith."

Commentary from the Church Fathers
Rabanus Maurus: "Great indeed was her faith; for the Gentiles, neither trained in the Law, nor educated by the words of the Prophets, straightway on the preaching of the Apostles obeyed with the hearing of the ear, and therefore deserved to obtain salvation."

Glossa Ordinaria: " And if the Lord delays the salvation of a soul at the first tears of the supplicating Church, we ought not to despair, or to cease from our prayers, but rather continue them earnestly."

Augustine: " And that to heal the Centurion’s servant, and the daughter of this Chananæan woman, He does not go to their houses, signifies that the Gentiles, among whom He Himself went not, should be saved by His word. That these are healed on the prayer of their parents, we must understand of the Church, which is at once mother and children; the whole body of those who make up the Church is the mother, and each individual of that body is a son of that mother."

Hilary of Poitiers: "Or, This mother represents the proselytes, in that she leaves her own country, and forsakes the Gentiles for the name of another nation; she prays for her daughter, that is, the body of the Gentiles possessed with unclean spirits; and having learned the Lord by the Law, calls Him the Son of David."

Rabanus Maurus: "Also whosoever has his conscience polluted with the defilement of any sin, has a daughter sorely vexed by a dæmon. Also whosoever has defiled any good that he has done by the plague of sin, has a daughter tossed by the furies of an unclean spirit, and has need to fly to prayers and tears, and to seek the intercessions and aids of the saints."

References

External links
Other translations of Matthew 15:28 at BibleHub

15:28